Degermark is a Swedish surname. Notable people with the surname include:

 Pia Degermark (born 1949), Swedish actress
 Rudolf Degermark (1886–1960), Swedish gymnast

Swedish-language surnames